Chantal Dällenbach (born 24 October 1962) is a French long-distance runner. She competed in the women's 10,000 metres at the 1996 Summer Olympics.

She became Swiss marathon champion on 20 October 2003 in Lausanne.

References

1962 births
Living people
Athletes (track and field) at the 1996 Summer Olympics
French female long-distance runners
Olympic athletes of France
Place of birth missing (living people)